Čađavica is a village and municipality in Croatia in the Virovitica–Podravina County. It has a population of 2,009 (2011 census), of which 90% are Croats. It is situated 14 kilometers NE of Slatina.
Until 1920 it was an integral part of Hungary.

The mother, Paula Mazaly, of the Hungarian Nobel-prize winner Georg von Békésy was born here. Navigable part of Drava river starts in the vicinity of Čađavica.

References

Municipalities of Croatia
Populated places in Virovitica-Podravina County